The 2011 Kansas Jayhawks football team represented the University of Kansas in the 2011 NCAA Division I FBS football season. The Jayhawks were led by second year head coach Turner Gill and played their home games at Memorial Stadium. They were a member of the Big 12 Conference.

The Jayhawks were picked to finish last by most voters in the preseason Big 12 polls. The Jayhawks conference schedule began with a loss at home to Texas Tech and ended with a loss to the Missouri in the Border Showdown game at Arrowhead Stadium in Kansas City. The Jayhawks finished with a 2–10 record, 0–9 in Big 12 play, and did not play in a bowl game for the third straight year. The Jayhawks had one of the toughest schedules in the nation. The Jayhawks schedule is currently ranked 4th in the nation according to Collegefootballpoll.com. During the season, the Jayhawks played Texas A&M and Missouri as members of the Big 12 for the final time, as both schools left for the SEC in July 2012.

Schedule

Game summaries

McNeese State

Northern Illinois

at Georgia Tech

Texas Tech

Roster

Postseason coaching change
Following their 59–21 loss to rival Kansas State, Kansas Athletic Director Sheahon Zenger, expressed his displeasure to the Jayhawks performance during the season in a press conference. In the press conference, Zenger said "I don't expect any player, coach, administrator, fan or alum to accept the performance on the field today or in recent weeks. We will get this thing fixed. We will continue to evaluate the program on a week-by-week basis. At the University of Kansas, we will never make complete evaluations until the season is complete and the body of work is in." Many local sports analysts interpreted that statement as Zenger officially putting head coach Turner Gill on the "hotseat" meaning he could be fired if things do not change. The day after losing KU's final game of the season to Missouri, Zenger fired Turner Gill who had a 5–19 record, 1–16 within the conference. Former Kansas City Chiefs offensive coordinator Notre Dame head coach Charlie Weis was hired to replace him on December 8.

References

Kansas
Kansas Jayhawks football seasons
Kansas Jayhawks football